Radko Polič (18 August 1942 – 15 September 2022) was a Slovenian theatre, television and film actor.

Biography
Born in Črnomelj, Polič's family moved to Belgrade in 1945 and then to West Berlin in 1949 before returning to Slovenia and settling in Ljubljana in 1954. He started acting in the early 1960s and during his career spanning over four decades, he played in over 150 theatre and film productions. He starred in stage productions all around Slovenia and appeared in a number of Yugoslav feature films.

Polič won numerous awards for his work, including the Golden Arena for Best Actor at the 1976 Pula Film Festival and the Best Actor award at the 10th Moscow International Film Festival for his role in Igor Pretnar's film Idealist, and the Prešeren Award for Life Achievement in 2007.

Polič was a descendant of Serbs of White Carniola. He died on 15 September 2022, at the age of 80.

Selected filmography
Battle of Neretva (Bitka na Neretvi, 1969)
The Widowhood of Karolina Zasler (Vdovstvo Karoline Žašler, 1976)
Idealist (1976)
Real Pests  (To so gadi, 1977)
Moment (1978)
Balkan Express (Balkan Ekspres, 1983)
In the Jaws of Life (U raljama života, 1984)
The End of the War (1984)
Taiwan Canasta (1985)
My Uncle's Legacy (Život sa stricem, 1988)
Silent Gunpowder (Gluvi barut, 1990)
Charuga (Čaruga, 1991)
Mathilde (2004)
Libertas (2006)
Night Boats (2012)

References

External links

Radko Polič profile at the Slovene National Theatre website 

1942 births
2022 deaths
Slovenian people of Serbian descent
Slovenian male stage actors
Golden Arena winners
Prešeren Award laureates
Slovenian male television actors
Slovenian male film actors
20th-century Slovenian male actors
21st-century Slovenian male actors
People from Črnomelj
Television people from Ljubljana